Wechselmann is a surname. Notable people with the surname include:

Erhard Wechselmann (1895–1943), German opera singer
Ignaz Wechselmann (1828–1903), Hungarian architect and philanthropist
Maj Wechselmann (born 1942), Danish-Swedish documentary director and filmmaker